Daniel Ezralow (born 22 September 1956) is an artistic director, choreographer, writer and performer.  He is known for his work in theater, film, opera, and television. His approach, style of physical expression, freedom of spirit and articulate athletic vocabulary have earned him an international reputation. He is the artistic director and founder of Ezralow Dance, a movement based ensemble and the creative home for Ezralow's body of work.

Career
Ezralow studied dance at the University of California at Berkeley and graduated in 1976. He began as a dancer with the dance companies 5X2 Plus, Lar Lubovitch, Paul Taylor, and Pilobolus. He was one of the original dancer-choreographers of MOMIX and is a founding member of ISO Dance.
In The New York Times review in 1986, the reviewer noted that "Daniel Ezralow is an unforgettably gutsy and intelligent virtuoso dancer."

He has created original works for, among others, Hubbard Street Dance Chicago, Batsheva Dance Company of Israel, the London Contemporary Dance Theatre, and the Cirque du Soleil show LOVE. His company, the Daniel Ezralow Dance Company performed at the
Tel Aviv Performing Arts Center, Israel, in the 2008-09 season. In a review of his work Super Straight is coming down by the Hubbard Street Dance Chicago in 1989, the reviewer wrote that it is a "coldly tormented work", and that "Ezralow has put his own manic stamp on the piecethe headlong barrel turns, the galumphing leaps, the desperate floor rollsand has potently contrasted such excesses with moments of sullen stillness."

His works for opera include The Flying Dutchman, for the Los Angeles and Houston Opera Companies, Maggio Musicale’s Aida with Zubin Mehta as conductor, and the Paris Opera Ballet. He also choreographs for advertising campaigns including The GAP, Issey Miyake, and Hugo Boss.

For theater he choreographed The Green Bird on Broadway in 2000 and Cats in Italy in 2009 for Compagnia della Rancia. He was the choreographer and aerial choreographer for the Broadway show musical adaptation of the Spider-Man comics, working with director Julie Taymor, in 2011.

In 2014 he choreographed the opening ceremony for the Sochi Olympics. In 2016 Ezralow toured with his dance company, Ezralow Dance, throughout America including dates at the Prince Theater and the Wallis Annenberg Center. He returned to the Annenberg later in 2017. Ezralow collaborated with Katy Perry and Skip Marley on the 59th Grammy awards, where Perry debuted her song "Chained to the Rhythm".

Work

Theatre
 Spider-Man: Turn Off the Dark (2011) (Choreographer and Aerial Choreographer)
 Cats (2009) (Co-Director) (Choreographer)
 Love (Cirque du Soleil) (2006) (Choreographer)
 The Green Bird (2000) (Choreographer)
 The Flying Dutchman (1995) (Choreographer)

Film
 Across the Universe (Julie Taymor, director, 2007)
 American Gun (2002)
 Love and Other Drugs (2010)
 How the Grinch Stole Christmas (2000)
 Earth Girls Are Easy (1988)
 The Witches Sabbath (1988)
 Camorra (A Story of Streets, Women and Crime) (1985)

Television
 The 59th Grammy Awards (2017) (choreographer)
 The 78th Annual Academy Awards (2006) (choreographer)
 Josh Groban in Concert (2002) (choreographer) (conceived)
 The 70th Annual Academy Awards (1998) (choreographer) (performer)
 Spot arcobaleno Telecom Italia (2013)

Choreography
 Psycho Killer (1985)
 Un complicato intrigo di donne, vicoli e delitti (1986)
 Eight Heads (1988)
 Le ragazze della terra sono facili (Earth Girls Are Easy)(1988)
 La visione del Sabba(1988)

Personal life
In 1999 Ezralow married Arabella Holzbog, the daughter of Thomas Jerald Holzbog, an architect, and they have two Children.

References

External links

American choreographers
Contemporary dance choreographers
American contemporary dancers
Living people
1956 births